Glasshouse is a 2021 South African dystopian thriller film directed by Kelsey Egan in her feature debut and co-written by Egan and Emma Lungiswa de Wet. It premiered at the 2021 Fantasia International Film Festival.

The first in a trio, it was made available to stream on DStv's Box Office and on Showmax in February 2022. Following a screening at the 2021 Sci-Fi-London, it had a 10 January 2022 digital release in the United Kingdom distributed by Signature Entertainment.

The film received six nominations at the 2022 South African Film and Television Awards, including Best Feature Film, winning five of them.

Premise
As a dementia-like toxin that wipes people's memories known as the Shred spreads, a family of a mother, three daughters, and one son isolate themselves in a greenhouse, which the mother calls the Sanctuary. Their ritualistic idyll is disrupted when the eldest daughter invites a wounded stranger into their home.

Cast
 Jessica Alexander as Bee
 Anja Taljaard as Evie
 Hilton Pelser as the Stranger
 Adrienne Pearce as Mother
 Brent Vermeulen as Gabe
 Kitty Harris as Daisy

Production

Principal photography took place in the Eastern Cape beginning in October 2020. De Wet, who grew up in the province, wrote the script with the Pearson Conservatory at St George's Park in mind. Nelson Mandela Bay Municipality granted the creators permission to use it as a filming location for six weeks, and they hired local crew for the film.

Reception
Rotten Tomatoes reported an approval rating of 90% based on 20 reviews, with an average rating of 7.7/10.

Awards and nominations

References

External links

2020s English-language films
2020s dystopian films
Apocalyptic films
Films about memory
Films about viral outbreaks
Films shot in the Eastern Cape
Folk horror films
Gothic horror films
Post-apocalyptic films
South African thriller films
South African science fiction thriller films
English-language South African films
English-language Showmax original programming
2021 directorial debut films